Short Orders is a 1923 film starring Stan Laurel.

Cast
 Stan Laurel - Waiter
 Marie Mosquini - Cashier
 Eddie Baker - Cafe owner
 Jack Ackroyd - Customer
 Mark Jones - Customer
 George Rowe - Chef

See also
 List of American films of 1923
 Stan Laurel filmography

References

External links

1923 films
American silent short films
1923 short films
American black-and-white films
1923 comedy films
Films directed by Scott Pembroke
Films directed by Hal Roach
Silent American comedy films
American comedy short films
1920s American films